Chris Vianney Bedia (born 5 March 1996) is an Ivorian professional footballer who plays for Swiss club Servette. Born and raised in the Ivory Coast, he debuted for the under-20s in the 2015 Toulon Tournament.

Club career
On 24 January 2022, Bedia signed with Servette in Swiss Super League.

Career statistics

Club

References

1996 births
Living people
Footballers from Abidjan
Association football forwards
Ivorian footballers
Ivory Coast under-20 international footballers
Tours FC players
R. Charleroi S.C. players
S.V. Zulte Waregem players
ES Troyes AC players
FC Sochaux-Montbéliard players
Servette FC players
Championnat National 3 players
Ligue 2 players
Belgian Pro League players
Ivorian expatriate footballers
Expatriate footballers in France
Ivorian expatriate sportspeople in France
Expatriate footballers in Belgium
Ivorian expatriate sportspeople in Belgium
Expatriate footballers in Switzerland
Ivorian expatriate sportspeople in Switzerland